This page provides supplementary chemical data on phosphorus tribromide.

Material Safety Data Sheet 
External MSDS sheets:
Fisher MSDS
Aldrich MSDS

Structure and properties

Thermodynamic properties

Spectral data

References

Chemical data pages
Chemical data pages cleanup